Stearic acid is a saturated fatty acid with an 18-carbon chain.  The IUPAC name is octadecanoic acid. It is a waxy solid with the formula . Its name comes from the Greek word στέαρ "stéar", which means tallow. The salts and esters of stearic acid are called stearates.  As its ester, stearic acid is one of the most common saturated fatty acids found in nature following palmitic acid. The triglyceride derived from three molecules of stearic acid is called stearin.

Occurrence and production 
Stearic acid is more abundant in animal fat (up to 30%) than in vegetable fat (typically <5%). The important exceptions are the foods cocoa butter (34%) and shea butter, where the stearic acid content (as a triglyceride) is 28–45%.

In terms of its biosynthesis, stearic acid is produced from carbohydrates via the fatty acid synthesis machinery wherein acetyl-CoA contributes two-carbon building blocks.

Stearic acid is obtained from fats and oils by the saponification of the triglycerides using hot water (about 100 °C). The resulting mixture is then distilled. Commercial stearic acid is often a mixture of stearic and palmitic acids, although purified stearic acid is available. Commercially, oleic acid, as found in palm and soy, can be hydrogenated to give stearic acid.

Uses
In general, the applications of stearic acid exploit its bifunctional character, with a polar head group that can be attached to metal cations and a nonpolar chain that confers solubility in organic solvents.  The combination leads to uses as a surfactant and softening agent. Stearic acid undergoes the typical reactions of saturated carboxylic acids, a notable one being reduction to stearyl alcohol, and esterification with a range of alcohols. This is used in a large range of manufactures, from simple to complex electronic devices.

As food additive
Stearic acid (E number E570) is found in some foods.

Soaps, cosmetics, detergents
Stearic acid is mainly used in the production of detergents, soaps, and cosmetics such as shampoos and shaving cream products. Stearate soap, such as sodium stearate, could be made from stearic acid but instead are usually produced by saponification of stearic acid-containing triglycerides.  Esters of stearic acid with ethylene glycol (glycol stearate and glycol distearate) are used to produce a pearly effect in shampoos, soaps, and other cosmetic products. Detergents are obtained from amides and quaternary alkylammonium derivatives of stearic acid.

Lubricants, softening and release agents
In view of the soft texture of the sodium salt, which is the main component of soap, other salts are also useful for their lubricating properties.  Lithium stearate is an important component of grease. The stearate salts of zinc, calcium, cadmium, and lead are used as heat stabilisers PVC.  Stearic acid is used along with castor oil for preparing softeners in textile sizing. They are heated and mixed with caustic potash or caustic soda.  Related salts are also commonly used as  release agents, e.g. in the production of automobile tires.  As an example, it can be used to make castings from a plaster piece mold or waste mold, and to make a mold from a shellacked clay original. In this use, powdered stearic acid is mixed in water and the suspension is brushed onto the surface to be parted after casting. This reacts with the calcium in the plaster to form a thin layer of calcium stearate, which functions as a release agent.

Steric acid can be converted to zinc stearate, which is used as a lubricant for playing cards (fanning powder) to ensure a smooth motion when fanning. Stearic acid is a common lubricant during injection molding and pressing of ceramic powders. It is also used as a mold release for foam latex that is baked in stone molds.

Niche uses
Being inexpensive, nontoxic, and fairly inert, stearic acid finds many niche applications.  Stearic acid is used as a negative plate additive in the manufacture of lead-acid batteries. It is added at the rate of 0.6 g per kg of the oxide while preparing the paste. It is believed to enhance the hydrophobicity of the negative plate, particularly during dry-charging process. It also reduces the extension of oxidation of the freshly formed lead (negative active material) when the plates are kept for drying in the open atmosphere after the process of tank formation. As a consequence, the charging time of a dry uncharged battery during initial filling and charging (IFC) is comparatively lower, as compared to a battery assembled with plates which do not contain stearic acid additive. Fatty acids are classic components of candle-making. Stearic acid is used along with simple sugar or corn syrup as a hardener in candies. In fireworks, stearic acid is often used to coat metal powders such as aluminium and iron. This prevents oxidation, allowing compositions to be stored for a longer period of time.

Metabolism
An isotope labeling study in humans concluded that the fraction of dietary stearic acid that oxidatively desaturates to oleic acid is 2.4 times higher than the fraction of palmitic acid analogously converted to palmitoleic acid.
Also, stearic acid is less likely to be incorporated into cholesterol esters.
In epidemiologic and clinical studies, stearic acid was found to be associated with lowered LDL cholesterol in comparison with other saturated fatty acids.

Examples
Salts
 Calcium stearate
 Cobaltous stearate
 Lithium stearate
 Magnesium stearate
 Mercuric stearate
 Sodium stearate
 Zinc stearate
Esters
 Estradiol stearate
 Glycol stearate
 Stearin
 Testosterone stearate

References

External links

NIST Chemistry WebBook Entry

Fatty acids
Stearates
Alkanoic acids
E-number additives